This is a list of airports in the Australian state of Western Australia. 



List of airports
The list is sorted by the name of the community served, click the sort buttons in the table header to switch listing order. Airports named in bold are Designated International Airports, even if they have limited or no scheduled international services.

Defunct airports

See also
List of airports in Perth
List of airports in Australia

Further reading

 
Western Australia
Airports